Paul-René Martin (11 August 1901 – 28 April 1987) was a Swiss middle-distance runner. He was the first Swiss sportsperson to compete at five Olympics, which he did from 1920 to 1936.

At every Olympics he competed in the 800 m; he won a silver medal in 1924, behind Douglas Lowe, and failed to reach the final in other years. In 1928 and 1936 he also took part in the 1500 m event, and finished sixth in 1928. At the 1936 Games Martin also submitted an entry in the literature section of the art competition.

References

See also
List of athletes with the most appearances at Olympic Games

Swiss male middle-distance runners
Olympic silver medalists for Switzerland
Athletes (track and field) at the 1920 Summer Olympics
Athletes (track and field) at the 1924 Summer Olympics
Athletes (track and field) at the 1928 Summer Olympics
Athletes (track and field) at the 1932 Summer Olympics
Athletes (track and field) at the 1936 Summer Olympics
Olympic athletes of Switzerland
1901 births
1987 deaths
Medalists at the 1924 Summer Olympics
Olympic silver medalists in athletics (track and field)
Olympic competitors in art competitions
Sportspeople from Geneva